The Fighting Fool  is a 1932 American pre-Code Western film directed by Lambert Hillyer and released by Columbia Pictures starring Tim McCoy, Marceline Day, and William V. Mong.

Cast
 Tim McCoy as Sheriff Tim Collins
 Marceline Day as Judith
 William V. Mong as Uncle John Lyman
 Arthur Rankin as Bud Collins
 Dorothy Granger as Nina
 Harry Todd as Deputy Hoppy
 Bob Kortman as Henchman Charley
 Tom Bay as Waiter (uncredited)
 Ralph Bucko as Cowhand (uncredited)
 Mary Carr as Old Woman (uncredited)
 Dick Dickinson as Henchman (uncredited)
 Jack Evans as Henchman (uncredited)
 Herman Hack as Barfly (uncredited)
 Jack Hendricks as Cowhand (uncredited)
 Jack Kirk as 3rd Bartender (uncredited)
 Frank Lanning as Barfly (uncredited)
 Lew Meehan as Henchman (uncredited)
 Buck Moulton as Henchman (uncredited)
 James Sheridan as Barfly (uncredited)
 Al Taylor as Henchman (uncredited)
 Ethel Wales as Aunt Jane (uncredited)
 Slim Whitaker as Rancher (uncredited)

Plot
Sheriff Collins pursues a villain who erroneously thinks that his father was killed by the sheriff.

References

External links

1932 films
American Western (genre) films
Columbia Pictures films
1932 Western (genre) films
American black-and-white films
Films directed by Lambert Hillyer
1930s English-language films
1930s American films